Delphacini is an important tribe of planthoppers with a world-wide distribution.

Nutrition and Pest species
All species are phytophagous, many occurring on various grasses, including cereal crop species.  Some of these planthoppers are important pests, either simply due to feeding, or they may also be vectors for plant pathogens.  Examples include:
 The rice brown planthopper, Nilaparvata lugens (Stål, 1854)
 The white-backed planthopper (of rice), Sogatella furcifera (Horváth, 1899)
 The sugarcane planthopper, Perkinsiella saccharicida Kirkaldy, 1903

Genera
BioLib and FLOW include the following:

 Abbrosoga Caldwell in Caldwell & Martorell, 1951
 Acanthodelphax Le Quesne, 1964
 Achorotile Fieber, 1866
 Acrodelphax Fennah, 1965
 Aethodelphax Bartlett & Hamilton, 2011
 Afrocoronacella Asche, 1988
 Afrokalpa Fennah, 1969
 Afrosellana Asche, 1988
 Afrosydne Fennah, 1969
 Agrisicula Asche, 1980
 Akemetopon Weglarz & Bartlett, 2011
 Akilas Distant, 1916
 Alketon Fennah, 1975
 Aloha Kirkaldy, 1904
 Altekon Fennah, 1975
 Ambarvalia (planthopper) Distant, 1917
 Amblycotis Stål, 1853
 Ampliphax Bartlett & Kunz, 2015
 Anchidelphax Fennah, 1965
 Anectopia Kirkaldy, 1907
 Aneuidellana Asche, 1988
 Aneuides Fennah, 1969
 Antidryas Asche, 1998
 Aoyuanus Ding & Chen, 2001
 Aplanodes Fennah, 1965
 Araeopus Spinola, 1839
 Asiracemus Asche, 1988
 Asiracina Melichar, 1912
 Astatometopon Campodonico, 2017
 Bakerella (planthopper) Crawford, 1914
 Bostaera Ball, 1902
 Brachycraera Muir, 1916
 Caenodelphax Fennah, 1965
 Calbodus Spinola, 1852
 Calisuspensus Ding, 2006
 Calligypona J. Sahlberg, 1871
 Cantoreanus Dlabola, 1971
 Cemopsis Fennah, 1978
 Cemus Fennah, 1964
 Changeondelphax Kwon, 1982
 Chionomus Fennah, 1971
 Chloriona Fieber, 1866
 Chlorionidea Löw, 1885
 Clydonagma Fennah, 1969
 Conomelus Fieber, 1866
 Consociata Qin & Zhang, 2006
 Coracodelphax Vilbaste, 1968
 Cormidius Emeljanov, 1972
 Coronacella Metcalf, 1950
 Cotoya Anufriev, 1977
 Criomorphus Curtis, 1833
 Curtometopum Muir, 1926
 Delphacellus Haupt, 1929
 Delphacinus Fieber, 1866
 Delphacissa Kirkaldy, 1906
 Delphacodes Fieber, 1866
 Delphacodoides Muir, 1929
 Delphax Fabricius, 1798
 Dianus Ding, 2006
 Dicentropyx Emeljanov, 1972
 Dicranotropis Fieber, 1866
 Dictyophorodelphax Swezey, 1907
 Dingiana Qin, 2005
 Diodelphax Yang, 1989
 Distantinus Bellis & Donaldson, 2015
 Ditropis Kirschbaum, 1868
 Ditropsis Wagner, 1963
 Dogodelphax Lindberg, 1956
 Ecdelphax Yang, 1989
 Elachodelphax Vilbaste, 1965
 Emelyanodelphax Koçak, 1981
 Emoloana Asche, 2000
 Eoeurysa Muir, 1913
 Eorissa Fennah, 1965
 Eripison Fennah, 1969
 Eshanus Ding, 2006
 Euconomelus Haupt, 1929
 Euconon Fennah, 1975
 Euidastor Fennah, 1969
 Euidellana Metcalf, 1950
 Euidelloides Muir, 1926
 Euides Fieber, 1866
 Euidopsis Ribaut, 1948
 Eumetopina Breddin, 1896
 Eurybregma Scott, 1875
 Euryburnia Emeljanov, 2019
 Eurysa Fieber, 1866
 Eurysacola Della Giustina, 2019
 Eurysanaea Della Giustina, 2019
 Eurysanoides Holzinger, Kammerlander & Nickel, 2003
 Eurysella Emeljanov, 1995
 Eurysiana Della Giustina, 2019
 Eurysula Vilbaste, 1968
 Falcotoya Fennah, 1969
 Fangdelphax Ding, 2006
 Ferganodelphax Dubovsky, 1970
 Flastena Nast, 1975
 Flavoclypeus Kennedy & Bartlett, 2014
 Florodelphax Vilbaste, 1968
 Formodelphax Yang, 1989
 Ganus Ding, 2006
 Garaga (planthopper) Anufriev, 1977
 Gelastodelphax Kirkaldy, 1906
 Glabrinotum Ding, 2006
 Gravesteiniella Wagner, 1963
 Guidelphax Ding, 2006
 Hadropygos Gonzon & Bartlett, 2007
 Hagamiodes Fennah, 1975
 Halmyra Mitjaev, 1971
 Hapalomelus Stål, 1853
 Haplodelphax Kirkaldy, 1907
 Harmalia Fennah, 1969
 Harmalianodes Asche, 1988
 Herbalima Emeljanov, 1972
 Himeunka Matsumura & Ishihara, 1945
 Hirozunka Matsumura & Ishihara, 1945
 Homosura Melichar, 1912
 Horcoma Fennah, 1969
 Horcomana Asche, 1988
 Horvathianella Anufriev, 1980
 Hyledelphax Vilbaste, 1968
 Idiobregma Anufriev, 1972
 Ilburnia White, 1878
 Indozuriel Fennah, 1975
 Ishiharodelphax Kwon, 1982
 Isodelphax Fennah, 1963
 Isogaetis Fennah, 1969
 Issedonia Emeljanov, 1972
 Iubsoda Nast, 1975
 Izella Fennah, 1965
 Javesella Fennah, 1963
 Jinlinus Ding, 2006
 Kakuna (planthopper) Matsumura, 1935
 Kartalia Koçak, 1981
 Kazachicesa Koçak & Kemal, 2010
 Kelisoidea Beamer, 1950
 Keyflana Beamer, 1950
 Kormus Fieber, 1866
 Kosswigianella Wagner, 1963
 Kusnezoviella Vilbaste, 1965
 Laccocera Van Duzee, 1897
 Laodelphax Fennah, 1963
 Laoterthrona Ding & Huang, 1980
 Latistria Huang & Ding, 1980
 Leialoha Kirkaldy, 1910
 Lepidelphax Remes Lenicov & Walsh, 2013
 Leptodelphax Haupt, 1927
 Leptoeurysa Fennah, 1988
 Leucydria Emeljanov, 1972
 Liburnia (planthopper) Stål, 1866
 Liburniella Crawford, 1914
 Lisogata Ding, 2006
 Litemixia Asche, 1980
 Litochodelphax Asche, 1982
 Loginovia Emeljanov, 1982
 Longtania Ding, 2006
 Luda (planthopper) Ding, 2006
 Luxorianella Asche, 1994
 Macrotomella Van Duzee, 1907
 Mahmutkashgaria Koçak & Kemal, 2008
 Makarorysa Remane & Asche, 1986
 Malaxodes Fennah, 1967
 Maosogata Ding, 2006
 Marquedryas Asche, 1998
 Matsumuramata Xing & Chen, 2014
 Matsumuranoda Metcalf, 1943
 Megadelphax Wagner, 1963
 Megamelanus Ball, 1902
 Megamelodes Le Quesne, 1960
 Megamelus Fieber, 1866
 Melaniphax Bartlett, 2019
 Meristopsis Kennedy, Bartlett & Wilson, 2012
 Mestus Motschulsky, 1863
 Metadelphax Wagner, 1963
 Metroma Ding, 2006
 Metropis Fieber, 1866
 Micistylus Guo & Liang, 2006
 Micreuides Fennah, 1969
 Mirabella (planthopper) Emeljanov, 1982
 Miranus Chen & Ding, 2001
 Monospinodelphax Ding, 2006
 Movesella Emeljanov, 1982
 Muellerianella Wagner, 1963
 Muirodelphax Wagner, 1963
 Nanotoya Fennah, 1975
 Nataliana Muir, 1926
 Nazugumia Koçak & Kemal, 2008
 Necodan Fennah, 1975
 Nemetor Fennah, 1969
 Neoconon Yang, 1989
 Neodelphax Remes Lenicov & Brentassi, 2017
 Neodicranotropis Yang, 1989
 Neogadora Fennah, 1969
 Neomegamelanus McDermott, 1952
 Neometopina Yang, 1989
 Neoperkinsiella Muir, 1926
 Neoterthrona Yang, 1989
 Nesodryas Kirkaldy, 1908
 Nesorestias Kirkaldy, 1908
 Nesorthia Fennah, 1962
 Nesosydne Kirkaldy, 1907
 Nesothoe Kirkaldy, 1908
 Neunkanodes Yang, 1989
 Neuterthron Ding, 2006
 Nicetor Fennah, 1964
 Nilaparvata Distant, 1906
 Niphisia Emeljanov, 1966
 Nothodelphax Fennah, 1963
 Nothokalpa Fennah, 1975
 Nothorestias Muir, 1917
 Notogryps Fennah, 1965
 Notohyus Fennah, 1965
 Numathriambus Asche, 1988
 Numatodes Fennah, 1964
 Nycheuma Fennah, 1964
 Oaristes Fennah, 1964
 Oncodelphax Wagner, 1963
 Onidodelphax Yang, 1989
 Opiconsiva Distant, 1917
 Orcaenas Fennah, 1969
 Orientoya Chen & Ding, 2001
 Palego Fennah, 1978
 Paraconon Yang, 1989
 Paracorbulo Tian, Ding & Kuoh, 1980
 Paradelphacodes Wagner, 1963
 Paradelphax Vilbaste, 1980
 Paraliburnia Jensen-Haarup, 1917
 Paranectopia Ding & Tian, 1981
 Parasogata Zhou, Yang & Chen, 2018
 Paratoya Ding, 2006
 Pareuidella Beamer, 1951
 Parkana Beamer, 1950
 Partoya Asche, 1988
 Pastiroma Dlabola, 1967
 Peliades (planthopper) Jacobi, 1928
 Penepissonotus Beamer, 1950
 Peregrinus (planthopper) Kirkaldy, 1904
 Perkinsiella Kirkaldy, 1903
 Phacalastor Kirkaldy, 1906
 Phrictopyga Caldwell & Martorell, 1951
 Phyllodinus Van Duzee, 1897
 Pissonotus Van Duzee, 1894
 Plagiotropis (planthopper) Emeljanov, 1993
 Platycorpus Ding, 1983
 Platypareia Muir, 1934
 Platytibia Ding, 2006
 Porcellus Emeljanov, 1972
 Prasliniana Asche, 1998
 Prodelphax Yang, 1989
 Prokelisia Osborn, 1905
 Pseudaraeopus Kirkaldy, 1904
 Pseudodelphacodes Wagner, 1963
 Pseudosogata Ding, 2006
 Pygospina Caldwell & Martorell, 1951
 Pyrophagus Remes Lenicov, 2014
 Qianlia Ding, 2006
 Queenslandicesa Koçak & Kemal, 2010
 Ramidelphax Qin & Zhang, 2006
 Rectivertex Guo & Liang, 2006
 Remanodelphax Drosopoulos, 1982
 Rhinodelphax Muir, 1934
 Rhinotettix Stål, 1853
 Rhombotoya Fennah, 1975
 Ribautodelphax Wagner, 1963
 Rotundifronta Beamer, 1950
 Salinesia Campodonico & Coccia, 2019
 Sardia Melichar, 1903
 Scolopygos Bartlett, 2002
 Scotoeurysa Fennah, 1988
 Scottianella Anufriev, 1980
 Sembrax Fennah, 1969
 Shadelphax Ding, 2006
 Shijidelphax Ding, 2006
 Sibirodelphax Vilbaste, 1980
 Sinolacme Fennah, 1978
 Sinoperkinsiella Ding, 1983
 Smicrotatodelphax Kirkaldy, 1906
 Sogata Distant, 1906
 Sogatella Fennah, 1956
 Sogatellana Kuoh, 1980
 Sparnia Stål, 1862
 Spartidelphax Bartlett & Webb, 2014
 Spinaprocessus Ding, 2006
 Spinidelphacella Asche, 1988
 Stiroma Fieber, 1866
 Stiromella Wagner, 1963
 Stiromeurysa Dlabola, 1965
 Stiromoides Vilbaste, 1971
 Stobaera Stål, 1859
 Stolbax Fennah, 1969
 Strophalinx Fennah, 1969
 Struebingianella Wagner, 1963
 Sulix Fennah, 1965
 Syndelphax Fennah, 1963
 Synpteron Muir, 1926
 Tagosodes Asche & Wilson, 1990
 Tarophagus Zimmerman, 1948
 Temenites Fennah, 1965
 Terthron Fennah, 1965
 Terthronella Vilbaste, 1968
 Thrasymemnon Fennah, 1965
 Thriambus (planthopper) Fennah, 1964
 Thymobares Fennah, 1964
 Thymodelphax Asche, 1988
 Toya (planthopper) Distant, 1906
 Toyalana Asche, 1988
 Toyoides Matsumura, 1935
 Tragediana Campodonico, 2017
 Trichodelphax Vilbaste, 1968
 Triloris Fennah, 1969
 Tsaurus Yang, 1989
 Tumidagena McDermott, 1952
 Ulanar Fennah, 1975
 Unkanodella Vilbaste, 1968
 Unkanodes Fennah, 1956
 Veo (planthopper) Fennah, 1978
 Wuyia Ding, 1991
 Xanthodelphax Wagner, 1963
 Xinchloriona Ding, 2006
 Yalia Ding, 2006
 Yangdelphax Bellis & Donaldson, 2016
 Yangsinolacme Ding, 2006
 Yanunka Ishihara, 1952
 Yichunus Ding, 2006
 Yukonodelphax Wilson, 1992
 Zanchetrius Fennah, 1978
 Zhuangella Ding, 2006
 Zhudelphax Ding, 2006

References

External links 
 
 

Hemiptera tribes
Delphacidae